The women's shot put event at the 1992 World Junior Championships in Athletics was held in Seoul, Korea, at Olympic Stadium on 16 and 17 September.

Medalists

Results

Final
17 September

Qualifications
16 Sep

Group A

Group B

Participation
According to an unofficial count, 22 athletes from 17 countries participated in the event.

References

Shot put
Shot put at the World Athletics U20 Championships